For people with the surname, see Kotei (surname).

Kotei is a town in the Oforikrom Municipality in the Ashanti Region of Ghana.  It is 10 kilometres from the centre Kumasi.  The town is a dormitory town that serves both inhabitants as well as students from the Kwame Nkrumah University of Science and Technology. The community has a police station.

Boundaries 
The town is bordered on all sides by the KNUST campus except the South which is bounded by Boadi.

References 

Populated places in Kumasi Metropolitan Assembly